Aretaphila of Cyrene  (c. 50 BC, Cyrene, an ancient Greek colony in North Africa) was a Cyrenean noblewoman. According to Plutarch in his work De mulierum virtutes (On the Virtues of Women), she deposed the tyrant Nicocrates.

Nicocrates forced Aretaphila to marry him after murdering her husband, Phaedimus. Under his rule, the citizens of Cyrene were brutalized, their property was seized, and their homes were destroyed. Aretaphila was determined to free her people from the violent ruler and conspired to poison him. Nicocrates mother, Calbia, suspected her plans and convinced him to have Aretaphila tortured. 

Aretaphila's forced second marriage produced one daughter, whom she encouraged to seduce her father's brother, Leander, in an effort to depose of her tyrannical father. Aretaphila was able to convince Leander to murder Nicocrates. Unfortunately, Leander proved to be as much of a tyrant as his brother, prompting Aretaphila to craft a new plan to free her people of oppressive foreign rulers. She bribed the Libyan Prince Anabus to capture Leander and arrest him. Aretaphila was praised by the Cyrenean public and offered a role in the new government, but declined. She is written to have spent the rest of her life in the women's quarters of her home, at her loom. Historians have debated Aretaphila's role as a cult figure for women in her time.

Notes

References
De Mulierum Virtutibus by Plutarch as published in Vol. III of the Loeb Classical Library edition, 1931. Accessed February 2008
Images of Women in Antiquity By Averil Cameron, Amélie Kuhrt. Published 1993. Routledge  . At Google books. Accessed February 2008

Mary Hays, “Aretaphila,” Female Biography; or, Memoirs of Illustrious and Celebrated Women of all Ages and Countries (6 volumes) (London: R. Phillips, 1803), vol. 1, 172-77, on 173.
 Donald White, The Extramural Sanctuary of Demeter and Persephone at Cyrene, Libya, Final Reports VIII: The Sanctuary’s Imperial Architectural Development, Conflict with Christianity, and Final Days (Philadelphia: University of Pennsylvania Press, 2012), 190; 195.

External links
Project Continua: Biography of Aretaphila

1st-century BC births
1st-century BC deaths
1st-century BC Greek women
Year of birth unknown
Year of death unknown
Ancient Cyrenaica